Theed may refer to:

People with the surname Theed
William Theed the elder (1764–1817), British sculptor, father of:
William Theed the younger (1804–1891), British sculptor
William A. C. Theed, owner of the Combe Sydenham estate and High Sheriff of Somerset

Geographic locations
New Theed, town on the eastern outskirts of Srinagar, India

Fictional locations
Theed, the capital city of the planet Naboo in the Star Wars series of films